Keith Milton Gordon (born 29 April 1927) was a rugby union player who represented Australia.

Gordon, a prop, was born in Coogee, New South Wales and claimed a total of two international rugby caps for Australia.

He attended Sydney Boys High School, playing alongside fellow Wallaby Saxon White, he graduated in 1946.

References

Australian rugby union players
Australia international rugby union players
1927 births
Living people
Rugby union players from Sydney
Rugby union props